Lithium telluride (Li2Te) is an inorganic compound of lithium and tellurium. Along with LiTe3, it is one of the two intermediate solid phases in the lithium-tellurium system. It can be prepared by directly reacting lithium and tellurium in a beryllium oxide crucible at 950°C.

References

Lithium compounds
Tellurides
Fluorite crystal structure